Francis Eardley (1885–1954) was an English footballer who played for Port Vale and Stoke.

Career
Eardley started his career with non-league amateur sides Hanley Town, Tunstall Park and Goldenhill Wanderers. He joined Stoke in 1908, scoring twice in three league games in 1908–09 before leaving the club the following year. Following this he signed with local side Port Vale, playing his first game for the club in a 3–0 defeat by Stoke Reserves at the Athletic Ground in a North Staffordshire & District League match on 8 October 1910. He scored four goals in eight games over all competitions before leaving the club at the end of the 1910–11 season.

Career statistics
Source:

References

Footballers from Stoke-on-Trent
English footballers
Association football forwards
Hanley Town F.C. players
Stoke City F.C. players
Port Vale F.C. players
1885 births
1954 deaths